Bùi Thị Thúy (born 17 July 1998) is a Vietnamese footballer who plays as a defender for Women's Championship club Than Khoáng Sản. She has been a member of the Vietnam women's national team.

References

1998 births
Living people
Women's association football defenders
Vietnamese women's footballers
Vietnam women's international footballers
21st-century Vietnamese women